Claessen is a Dutch patronymic surname ("son of Claes"). Notable people with the surname include:

Bart Claessen (born 1980), Dutch dance DJ known as Barthezz
George Claessen (1909–1999), Sri Lankan artist and poet
Gustave Claessen (fl. 1920), Belgian cyclist
Hans Claessen (1562–1623), Dutch merchant and founder of the New Netherland Company
Henri J. M. Claessen (born 1930), Dutch anthropologist
Roger Claessen (1941-1982), Belgian footballer
Claesen
 (born 1956), Belgian conductor
Nico Claesen (born 1962), Belgian footballer

See also
Claessens, surname
Claassen, surname
Klaasen, surname
Klaassen, surname

Dutch-language surnames
Patronymic surnames